David Copperfield is a 1993 Canadian traditionally animated film adaptation of Charles Dickens' classic 1850  novel of the same name. Produced for NBC, the film is directed by Don Arioli and features the voices of Sheena Easton, Julian Lennon, Howie Mandel, Andrea Martin, Kelly Le Brock, Michael York and Joseph Marcell.

Loosely based on Dickens' original plot, the human characters are replaced with anthropomorphic animals. It omits several major characters (such as Mr Creakle, Dora Spenlow and Uriah Heep) and adds fantastical elements, such as the "moldies" and the "cheese monster".

Plot
The film starts with a female cat named Betsey Trotwood impatiently making her way through the Christmas festive streets of Blunderstone to see her niece, Clara. As she passes, the film's main villains, a leonine named Edward Murdstone and a fat rodent named Grimby are seeking new "workers" — i.e. abducting orphans and urchins off the streets.

At the Copperfield estate, David is brought into the world and named after his late father. Betsey arrives with the belief that her niece gave birth to a daughter. When she finds out that her great-niece is actually a great-nephew, Betsey is furious and leaves in a huff.

Years later, Clara marries Murdstone who repeatedly reassures her that it's for the best; David, however, does not approve of the marriage and despises Murdstone. When she is brought down by illness, Murdstone arranges for David to move with him to London where he'll work in his factory. David protests but is forced to go along, although he has a chance encounter with love interest Agnes Wickfield when her father the Duke comes by Murdstone's factory. Once Agnes and the Duke are gone, Murdstone cruelly throws David into the factory where he is beaten and tossed about by Murdstone's security force.

David is given shelter in the Micawber's house, and is befriended by a dog named Mealy (who was abducted the night David was born). Although the Micawber's act cruel toward David and the others in front of Murdstone and his men, in truth they are actually heartwarming toward the youth. Murdstone reveals to Grimby that he's been taking Clara's letters to David, making him unaware of his mother's condition. David hopes to escape from the factory though Mealy tells him of the various obstacles like the "Cheese Monster," a beastly vulture that circles the premises to catch runaways. With this in mind, David turns his focus to Robinson Crusoe–inspired methods of bettering the workplace. Murdstone discovers this and punishes David and Mealy by isolating them in the factory's tower. Later, he blackmails the Micawber's by making sure David is not treated with care or else their children would work in the factory.

Meanwhile, Agnes (disguised in a beggar's cloak) makes her way towards Murdstone's factory and sees just how hellish life is down there. While working the night shift, David gets a glimpse of the "Moldies" in a drainage grate. "Moldies" were one of Murdstone's experiments gone wrong that spread and trapped the workers in a mold-like slime - and anyone who touches the mold would suffer the same fate. Agnes and David reunite, but Murdstone appears and forcefully ushers Agnes out. To make matters worse, the Duke is more concerned with how this might damage his reputation rather than listening to his daughter.

When Clara dies, Peggotty arrives and has Micawber hide Clara's will in his chimney while also giving David the sad news. Later, Mealy reveals that Murdstone and Grimby have been fattening up the Cheese Monster so they can eat the vulture. The Cheese Monster overhears this and becomes upset by this betrayal.

Murdstone and Grimby find the will and revel in David's seemingly broken state, but Mealy and David set up their plot to escape. Agnes arrives to seek out David but is captured. Mealy briefly fights off Grimby and Murdstone for a chance to get David over the gate, while Agnes gets away from the crooked guards. The Cheese Monster gives David a chance to catch up to Agnes and the two leave for Dover where Aunt Betsey lives. Micawber and Mealy are tossed into the sewers where the Moldies lurk while Peggotty and Mrs. Micawber are kept under security.

Later that night, Agnes gets separated from David and is chased by a bunch of wild boars who trap her in a tree. David finds her the next morning, and with some effort, pushes a boulder to ward off the boars. However, the boulder also knocks over the tree and Agnes' cries for help catch the attention of Murdstone and Grimby. Both Agnes and David plummet down a waterfall, but emerge from the water not far from Aunt Betsey's place. Aunt Betsey, despite her earlier animosity, is glad to see David and agrees to help get back at Murdstone and Grimby and freeing their slaves.

Murdstone and Grimby try to get the Duke to sign over complete control of the cheese factory, but Aunt Betsey comes in with a full-on police force to arrest them while David fights off Murdstone and Grimby. The employees are freed and celebrate as Murdstone and Grimby are taken away. David finds and helps Mealy and Micawber (now mostly covered in mold) to escape, along with the Mouldies. The full-on sunlight that comes through the open grating is enough to break open the Moldies' cheese shells and return them to normal.

The film ends on Christmas with David hosting the grand opening of the Copperfield Orphanage (with all Murdstone's former workers there) and everyone cheering for David and Agnes' love.

Cast

Songs
The songs are written by Al Kasha and Joel Hirschhorn.

 "I Hate Boys!" – Aunt Betsey (Martin)
 "I'll Be Your Hero" – David (Lennon)
 "Welcome to my Warehouse" – Murdstone and Grimby (York and Dumont)
 "Is There Anyone?" – Agnes and David (Easton and Lennon)
 "Something's Gonna Turn Up" – David and Micawber (Lennon and Marcell)
 "Imagination" – (Groulx)
 "Everyone's a Big Cheese Here" – (Groulx)
 "Street Smart" – Mealy (Mandel; although featured, this song was mysteriously uncredited)
 "Family Christmas" – Agnes, David, Micawber and Aunt Betsey (Easton, Lennon, Marcell and Martin)

See also
 List of animated feature-length films

References

External links

1993 films
1993 television films
1993 animated films
Films based on David Copperfield
Christmas television specials
Television shows based on David Copperfield
NBC television specials
Canadian Christmas films
Canadian animated feature films
French animated films
NBC original programming
American Christmas television specials
1990s children's animated films
Animated Christmas films
1990s Canadian films
1990s French films